Daniele Barboli, O.P. (died 25 February, 1570) was a Roman Catholic prelate who served as Bishop of Pedena (1563–1570).

Biography
Daniele Barboli was ordained a priest in the Order of Preachers. On 4 June 1563, he was appointed during the papacy of Pope Pius IV as Bishop of Pedena. He served as Bishop of Pedena until his death on 25 February 1570.

References 

16th-century Roman Catholic bishops in Croatia
Bishops appointed by Pope Pius IV
1570 deaths
Dominican bishops